Nakhl-e Ghanem (also Romanized as Nakhl-e Ghānem and Nakhl Ghānem; also known as Nakhlawand) is a village in Howmeh Rural District, in the Central District of Kangan County, Bushehr Province, Iran. At the 2006 census, its population was 145, in 37 families.

References 

Populated places in Kangan County